Chalatenango is a department of El Salvador, located in the northwest of the country. The capital is the city of Chalatenango. The Chalatenango Department encompasses 2,017 km² and contains more than 204,000 inhabitants. Las Matras Archaeological Ruins contains the relics of prehistoric populations and caves in which rock writing is found.  The "5 de Noviembre" Hydroelectric Dam is found in Chalatenango Department, near the border with Cabañas. The highest point in the country, El Pital with an elevation of 2730m, is also located in Chalatenango Department.

Agriculture
The most cultivated agricultural products are the basic grains, henequen (a type of agave), coffee, fruits, orchard plants, and vegetables, horses and cattle, and wilderness agriculture. Moreover, plaster, gold, lime, clay lead, silver, and zinc can be found there.

History 
Around 1790, Francisco Luis Héctor de Carondelet, Governor of El Salvador, found that the local indigenous population working in Chaletenango's indigo industry had declined greatly. Carondolet responded by bringing poor Spaniards from Galicia, Asturias and Cantabria to settle, with the result that many blond and light skinned/eyed people may still be found in the Chalatenango Department today.

Chalatenango was made a department on February 14, 1855.

During the 1980s, the department was the stronghold of the Farabundo Martí Popular Forces of Liberation (FPL), one of the two largest groups in the Frente Farabundo Martí Para la Liberacion Nacional (FMLN).

Municipalities

 Agua Caliente
 Arcatao
 Azacualpa
 Chalatenango
 Citalá
 Comalapa
 Concepción Quezaltepeque
 Dulce Nombre de María
 El Carrizal
 El Paraíso
 La Laguna
 La Palma
 La Reina
 Las Vueltas
 Nombre de Jesús
 Nueva Concepción
 Nueva Trinidad
 Ojos de Agua
 Potonico
 San Antonio de la Cruz
 San Antonio Los Ranchos
 San Fernando
 San Francisco Lempa
 San Francisco Morazán
 San Ignacio
 San Isidro Labrador
 San José Cancasque
 San José Las Flores
 San Luis del Carmen
 San Miguel de Mercedes
 San Rafael
 Santa Rita
 Tejutla

References

External links 
 Alcaldia Municipal de Chalatenango, 2009-2012. 
 Atlas Geográfico Universal y de El Salvador. Editorial Oceano. Edición 1995 
 Sitio web del departamento de Chalatenango

 
Departments of El Salvador
States and territories established in 1855
1855 establishments in El Salvador